Djendel District is a district of Aïn Defla Province, Algeria.

Municipalities
The district is further divided into three municipalities.
Djendel
Barbouche
Oued Chorfa

Districts of Aïn Defla Province